Indeep was a 1980s New York-based group that was best known for its song "Last Night a D.J. Saved My Life".

Career
The group was led by its songwriter-musician Michael Cleveland, and it was known for employing a strong disco-esque bass line and early hip hop lyrics backed by two female singers: Réjane Magloire and Rose Marie Ramsey.

"Last Night a D.J. Saved My Life" was released on Sound of New York/Becket Records in 1982 and peaked in early 1983, reaching the top 10 on the US R&B and No. 2 on the US Club charts as well as the Top 3 in the Dutch Top 40 and the Top 15 in the UK, and was certified for gold-level sales in France. The 12" mix was notable at the time for including a purely vocal mix, an instrumental mix plus a track of sound effects contained in the song such as a toilet flushing and a phone ringing. The aim was to encourage mixing in the emerging New York DJ scene of the early 1980s and elsewhere.

The follow-up single, "When Boys Talk," did not achieve the same level of success on either side of the Atlantic, which, combined with its limited later success, put the group into the one-hit wonders category. Vocalist Magloire later enjoyed some success with the Belgian techno-house outfit Technotronic. "Last Night a DJ Saved My Life" was later covered by Mariah Carey on her 2001 album Glitter, which reached No. 25 in Spain.

In the 1990s, Michael Cleveland did not perform as Indeep besides a 1997 New Year's show on TF1 French TV.

In 2011, Peter A. Mercury, who published, managed, produced and toured with many top artists for many years convinced Cleveland to reform the band. Magloire and Ramsey were replaced by Beckie Bell and WiX.

Discography

Albums

Singles

References

External links
 

Musical groups established in 1980
American post-disco music groups
American dance music groups